HMIS Deccan (J129) was a s built for the Royal Navy, but transferred to the Royal Indian Navy (RIN) during the Second World War.

Design and description
The Bangor class was designed as a small minesweeper that could be easily built in large numbers by civilian shipyards; as steam turbines were difficult to manufacture, the ships were designed to accept a wide variety of engines. The ship's complement consisted of 60 officers and ratings.

She was powered by two vertical triple-expansion steam engines (VTE), each driving one shaft, using steam provided by two Admiralty three-drum boilers.

The VTE-powered Bangors were armed with a QF 12-pounder (7.62 cm) anti-aircraft gun and a single QF 2-pounder (4 cm) AA gun or a quadruple mount for the Vickers .50 machine gun. In some ships the 2-pounder was replaced a single or twin  20 mm Oerlikon AA gun, while most ships were fitted with four additional single Oerlikon mounts over the course of the war. For escort work, their minesweeping gear could be exchanged for around 40 depth charges.

Construction and career
HMIS Deccan was ordered in 1942, and built by Garden Reach Shipbuilders & Engineers in India for the Royal Navy. She was commissioned in March 1945, just months before the end of World War II. HMIS Deccan was a part of the Eastern Fleet, and escorted a few convoys between Africa, British India and Australia in 1945. She was also deployed for mine clearance operations off Phuket.

References

Bibliography
 

 

Bangor-class minesweepers of the Royal Indian Navy
1944 ships
British ships built in India
World War II minesweepers of India